Toolakea is a coastal town and suburb in the City of Townsville, Queensland, Australia.

Geography 

The Toolakea community stretches approximately  along the Esplanade.

History 
Toolakea is an Aboriginal word, possibly from Warakami language meaning sunny place.

Amenities 
Facilities include a park with public toilets, barbecues, picnic tables and a children's playground.

Education 
There are no schools in Toolakea. The nearest primary school is Bluewater State School in neighbouring Bluewater to the south-west. The nearest secondary school is Northern Beaches State High School in Deeragun to the south-east.

References

External links 

 

Suburbs of Townsville